Patsch is a municipality in the district of Innsbruck-Land in the Austrian state of Tyrol located 6.7 km south of Innsbruck at the bottom of the Patscherkofel.

It is one of the oldest villages in the southern low mountain range around the capital and was mentioned in documents for the first time around 1200 as „Patsche or Pats“.

Population

References

External links

Cities and towns in Innsbruck-Land District